The spinach (Eulithis mellinata) is a moth of the family Geometridae. The species was first described by Johan Christian Fabricius in 1787. It is found throughout much of the Palearctic region and the Near East though its distribution is rather local due to its specialized larval food plant. In the British Isles it is fairly common in England and Wales but much rarer in Scotland and Ireland.

Its wingspan is 33–38 mm. The forewings are yellow marked with brown fascia and apical streak with brown chequering on the fringe. The hindwings are plain cream but are rarely seen as the species usually rests in a very distinctive and characteristic way with the forewings held out at 90° to the body with the hindwings hidden behind them. Some other members of the genus such as the northern spinach and barred straw rest in a similar way. The species flies at night from June to August  and is attracted to light.

The larva is green with white lines and feeds exclusively on currants. The species overwinters as an egg.

The flight season refers to the British Isles. This may vary in other parts of the range.

References 
Chinery, Michael Collins Guide to the Insects of Britain and Western Europe 1986 (Reprinted 1991)
Skinner, Bernard Colour Identification Guide to Moths of the British Isles 1984

External links

The Spinach at UKMoths
Lepiforum e.V.

Cidariini
Moths described in 1787
Moths of Europe
Taxa named by Johan Christian Fabricius